Pulavakalipalayam is a panchayat village in Gobichettipalayam taluk in Erode District of Tamil Nadu state, India. The village is located on the road connecting Gobichettipalayam (about 5 km away) and the district headquarters, Erode (30 km). Pulavakalipalayam has a population of about 4,442. It comes under anthiyur assembly constituency and Tiruppur parliamentary constituency.

References

Villages in Erode district